Bryce Aron (born 30 September 2003 in Winnetka, Illinois) is an American racing driver who is currently racing in the GB3 Championship with Hitech GP alongside Luke Browning and Cian Shields. In 2021 he joined Carlin where he partnered with. Zak O'Sullivan and Christian Mansell. Bryce is the winner of the 2020 Team USA Scholarship and made history as the first American to finish top 5 in both events receiving a Podium in the Walter Hayes Trophy Grand Final.

Career

Formula Ford

BRSCC National Formula Ford Championship 
In 2020, Aron moved to the UK to compete with Low Dempsey Racing in the BRSCC National Formula Ford Championship. Due to the pandemic, the championship was shortened to just 3 rounds and 7 races and Aron finished 5th in the standings, having won pole position in the penultimate round at Brands Hatch. In order to supplement the shortened race calendar, Low Dempsey Racing participated in a variety of additional series including the Champion of Brands, Champion of Cadwell and the majority of the Castle Combe Championship. Aron won the Champion of Cadwell.

2020 Team USA Scholarship Winner 
Aron was one of three winners of the highly coveted 2020 Team USA Scholarship. At the Formula Ford Festival Aron finished 3rd in the semi-final. Aron “ran strongly in third place until being elbowed down to fifth following a late-race Safety Car interruption.” Aron then went on to the Walter Hayes Trophy, where out of 103 drivers he finished on the podium in 3rd place, having been the 7th American to finish on the Walter Hayes Podium. Aron made history as the first American to finish with a top 5 and a podium in the two end of year iconic events.

GB3 Championship

2021 
Aron joined Carlin for 2021, progressing to the GB3 Championship alongside teammates O’Sullivan and Mansell. Aron had what was hailed as a stunning debut at Brands Hatch where he made bold moves to end the race weekend with a 4th place finish.

2022 
In 2022 Aron joined Hitech GP where he contributed to the their first GB3 championship team's win. Aron scored 8 top 10 finishes, 5 of which came during the last 2 rounds. Aron ended the season by out-qualifying his teammates and then scoring a race 2 podium.  Aron scored 3 podiums and a win in the 2022 championship.

Euroformula Open 
Aron moved to the Euroformula Open in 2023, teaming up with Team Motopark.

Racing record

Racing career summary 

* Season still in progress.

Complete GB3 Championship results 
(key) (Races in bold indicate pole position) (Races in italics indicate fastest lap)

Complete Euroformula Open Championship results 
(key) (Races in bold indicate pole position) (Races in italics indicate fastest lap)

* Season still in progress.

References

External links 

 Team USA Scholarship

Living people
2003 births
American racing drivers
BRDC British Formula 3 Championship drivers
Carlin racing drivers
Formula Ford drivers
Hitech Grand Prix drivers
Euroformula Open Championship drivers
Motopark Academy drivers